Streptomyces echinatus is a bacterium species from the genus of Streptomyces which was isolated from soil in Angola. Streptomyces echinatus produces echinomycin, dehydrosinefungin A and aranciamycin.

Further reading

See also 
 List of Streptomyces species

References

External links
Type strain of Streptomyces echinatus at BacDive -  the Bacterial Diversity Metadatabase

echinatus
Bacteria described in 1957